Urney Chocolates is a confectionery business founded in County Donegal by the Gallagher family now based in County Kildare, Ireland. The brand is presently operated by L.C. Confectionery Ltd.

History 
Urney Chocolates was established in 1919 by Eileen and Harry Gallagher at their home, Urney House, in the parish of Urney, County Tyrone. Harry Gallagher was Crown Solicitor for County Donegal. Sweet-making was one of a number of local industries started by Eileen Gallagher based in the back garden of their house in an effort to stem the tide of emigration from the area.

Urney Chocolates was the only chocolate manufacturer based in Ireland in the 1920s. Sourcing most of their supplies from Ireland, and stressed this fact in their advertisements and as a result were most popular in what would become the Republic of Ireland and made little impact in Northern Ireland. A consignment of Urney chocolates was returned to the factory marked "We want no pope here" as part of the Protestant boycott of Catholic goods.

The original factory burned down in 1924 and they moved production to Belgard Road, Tallaght, Dublin. By the 1960s Urney Chocolates and its subsidiaries were employing almost 1,000 workers. At that time it was considered one of the largest chocolate factories in Europe.

The New York-based company, W & R Grace bought Urney's out in 1963 and sold it on as a going concern to Unilever in 1970. Unilever soon changed the name to HB Chocolates. They ceased production in 1980. The former factory became a DIY store.

Branded products
 Catch bar
 Urney Anytime Assortment (formerly advertised as "any time is Urney time")
 Urney Two and Two
 Hadji Bey's Turkish Delight

References

External links

South Dublin Libraries Urney Collection

County Kildare
Food and drink companies established in 1919
Brand name confectionery
1919 establishments in Ireland